The World Championships of Ski Mountaineering are biannually held ski mountaineering competitions.

History 
The events were originally sanctioned by the International Council for Ski Mountaineering Competitions (ISMC). The first official world mastership of the ISMC was carried out in the "International Year of Mountains" (2002), declared by the United Nations. The championship was held in Serre Chevalier, France, from January 24 to January 27, 2002. Prior the Italian Trofeo Mezzalama was held as "World Championship of Ski Mountaineering" with the classes "Civilians", "Soldiers" and "Mountain guides" in 1975. Because the ISMC merged into the International Ski Mountaineering Federation (ISMF) in 2008, the next championships were sanctioned by the ISMF. In 2011, the originally planned 9th edition of the European Championships of Ski Mountaineering at last was held as 6th edition of the World Championships.

Further venues of the ISMC World Championships were the Aran Valley (Spain) in 2004, the Italian Province of Cuneo in 2006, and Portes du Soleil (Switzerland) in 2008. The World Championships are supported by the national organizations of the carrying out countries.

Ratings 
The disciplines are rated by gender and age groups. In 2002, only individual and team (2 racers) races were held and rated, added with a combined ranking. At the 2004 championship a relay event and a vertical race competition were added. The men's relay teams were of four racers and the women's teams of three. In the following years all relay teams were of four ski mountaineers. In 2006 the relay race was canceled because of bad snow conditions, and consequently there was no combined ranking. At the 2008 World Masterships a long-distance race was added.

The national squads are often mixed with up an coming athletes of the "Espoirs"-level. Some nations  do not have squads with enough racers for all disciplines.

Medalist nations and disciplines 
(by point-awarding system)

See also
ISMF World Cup Ski Mountaineering

References

External links 
 Ski Mountaineering World Championship 2002, president of the UIAA Ian McNaught-Davis

 
Ski mountaineering competitions
Mountaineering